The Tale of a Tiger is a dramatic monologue by Dario Fo. Fo collected material for it during a June 1975 visit to China with his wife Franca Rame and other members of their theatre company, and he toured around Italy with it in 1978.

Plot summary
During Mao's Long March across China, a revolutionary soldier is wounded. His comrades leave him behind. Gangrene sets in, and he believes that he is about to die. He drags himself into a cave and falls into a deep sleep. When he awakens, he is confronted by the sight of a tiger and her cub. What follows is a comic narrative about their domestic life together, as the tiger nurses him back to health.

Translations
Ed Emery has carried out an authorised English translation.

Further reading

References

1978 plays
Plays by Dario Fo
Tigers in popular culture
Plays about war
Plays set in China
Plays set in the 1930s
Cultural depictions of Mao Zedong